Donald Johnson and Jared Palmer were the defending champions but did not compete that year.

Martin Damm and Cyril Suk won in the final 6–4, 7–6, [10–8] against Mark Knowles and Daniel Nestor.

Seeds

  Mark Knowles /  Daniel Nestor (final)
  Martin Damm /  Cyril Suk (champions)
  Yevgeny Kafelnikov /  Radek Štěpánek (first round)
  Julien Boutter /  Fabrice Santoro (first round)

Draw

External links
 2003 Qatar ExxonMobil Open Doubles Draw

Doubles